= JŽ series 341 =

JŽ 341
Type and origin
- Power type: Electric
- Builder: Alstom
- Build date: 1955/12/01
Specifications
- Configuration
  - AAR: Bo'Bo'
- Gauge: 1,435 mm (4 ft 8 1/2 in) standard gauge
- Length: 16 m (52 ft 5.9 in)
- Loco weight: 80 t (79 long tons; 88 short tons)
- Electric system/s: 3,000 V DC Catenary
- Current pickup: Pantograph
Performance figures
- Maximum speed: 95 km/h (59 mph)
- Power output: 1,375 kW (1,844 hp)
Career
- Numbers: 341
- Nicknames: "Marijana"
- Locale: Croatia

The single locomotive designated JŽ 341 is a curiosity.

It was originally designed for hauling freight and passenger-trains on the then new mountain part of the electrified Rijeka mainline. When it was found out, that the axle load was high (20 t or 19.7 long tons or 22.0 short tons), further orders were cancelled. The maintenance and usage of this locomotive caused troubles in that there was only one unit of this type. The production and holding of spare parts was uneconomical.

The final years of this locomotive were used in banking freight traffic over the very hilly and difficult Rijeka-Zagreb line between Fužine and Lokve.

The locomotive was retired sometime around 1986.

Photographs of this locomotive are very rare.
